The Adjutant of the Czar is a 1929 German drama film directed by Vladimir Strizhevsky and starring Ivan Mozzhukhin, Carmen Boni and Fritz Alberti. It is set in Tsarist Russia.

The film's sets were designed by the art directors Otto Erdmann and Hans Sohnle.

Cast
 Ivan Mozzhukhin as Prince Boris Kurbski
 Carmen Boni as Helena di Armore
 Eugen Burg as Baron Korff
 George Seroff as General Koloboff
 Fritz Alberti as General Trunoff
 Daniel Dolski as Prince's manservant
 Alexander Polonsky as Servant
 Alexander Granach as Stranger

References

External links

1929 films
1929 drama films
German drama films
Films of the Weimar Republic
German silent feature films
Films directed by Vladimir Strizhevsky
Films set in Russia
German black-and-white films
1920s German-language films
Silent drama films
1920s German films